Wilton station in Wilton, North Dakota, USA, was built in 1900 by the Minneapolis, St. Paul and Sault Ste. Marie Railroad. Designed by William J. Keith, it was listed on the National Register of Historic Places in 1978 as the Minneapolis, St. Paul and Sault Sainte Marie Railroad Company Depot.  It is also known as Soo Line Depot.

According to its NRHP nomination, the station "is historically significant for its association with William Drew Washburn (1831-1912). It is architecturally distinctive for its incorporation of a pagoda-like tower within what is otherwise a conventional design for a railroad structure."

References

Railway stations on the National Register of Historic Places in North Dakota
Railway stations in the United States opened in 1900
Former Soo Line stations
National Register of Historic Places in McLean County, North Dakota
Former railway stations in North Dakota
Transportation in McLean County, North Dakota
1900 establishments in North Dakota